Events from the year 1784 in Ireland.

Incumbent
Monarch: George III

Events
11 February – Royal College of Surgeons in Ireland chartered.
15 April – the first ascent of a manned balloon in the British Isles takes place with a hot air balloon at Navan
The Old Bushmills Distillery becomes an officially registered company
The post of Postmasters General of Ireland established
William Conyngham begins installation of a planned settlement on Rutland Island, County Donegal
New Church of Ireland St. John's Cathedral, Cashel, completed
The satirist John Williams is prosecuted for an attack on the Duke of Rutland's administration in the Volunteers' Journal and flees the country

Births
12 May – James Sheridan Knowles, dramatist and actor (died 1862).
20 September – Sir Richard John Griffith, 1st Baronet, geologist (died 1878).
Full date unknown
Richard Church, soldier, military officer and general in the Greek Army (died 1873).
Thomas Barnwall Martin, soldier, landowner and politician (died 1847).

Deaths
3 April – John Gore, 1st Baron Annaly, politician and peer (born 1718).
26 April – Nano Nagle, founder of the Presentation Sisters (born 1718).
29 May – George Barret, Sr., artist (born c.1730).
Thomas Cooley, architect (born 1740 in England).

References

 
Years of the 18th century in Ireland
Ireland
1780s in Ireland